The woolly elm aphid (Eriosoma americanum) is an aphid native to North America, found where Saskatoon (Amelanchier alnifolia) and American (Ulmus americana) elm trees are established. 

The aphid feeds on the Saskatoon elm in late spring through fall, and the American elm during both early spring and late fall.

Symptoms of American elm infestations include curled elm leaves, later accompanied by masses of visible dark areas and cottony masses.  As with other aphids, honeydew may be found on infected leaves, excreted by the aphids after feeding on the plant's sap.

References 

Eriosoma (aphid)
Hemiptera of North America
Insects described in 1879